Man to Man is a 2017 South Korean television series starring Park Hae-jin, Park Sung-woong, Kim Min-jung, Chae Jung-an, and Yeon Jung-hoon.

Synopsis
A longtime celebrity Yeo Woon-gwang (Park Sung-woong) suddenly has a need for a bodyguard and hires Kim Seol-woo (Park Hae-jin), a handsome and mysterious man trained in special investigations who has many talents. In reality, Seol-woo is a NIS black ops agent who has his own agenda and the role of bodyguard is only a cover to achieve his goals. The drama is about the twisty events they encounter and the budding bromance between the star and bodyguard. In addition, Seol-woo gets romantically involved with Cha Do-ha (Kim Min-jung), the manager of Woon-gwang.

Cast

Main
 Park Hae-jin as Kim Seol-woo
Main protagonist of the series. An elite black ops agent known only to the highest tiers of national intelligence. He never fails at a mission and keeps everything hidden behind a poker face. As he takes on a secret mission to protect a Hallyu star, he meets his greatest challenge.
 Park Sung-woong as Yeo Woon-gwang
A stuntman turned Hallyu action star, an actor beloved for being a bad guy onscreen. He hides a secret from his past. He hates Songsan. He deeply cares for Do-ha and considers her his sister. 
 Kim Min-jung as Cha Do-ha
Female lead of the series. Head of Woon-gwang's fanclub who later gets a job at his management company as his manager. She meets both Seol-woo and Woon-gwang, and gets entangled with them.
 Chae Jung-an as Song Mi-eun
A former Miss Korea who is currently married to Seung-jae and the ex-girlfriend of Woon-gwang. After marriage, she has a son and lives the life of a devoted wife, but is wary of her husband.
 Yeon Jung-hoon as Mo Seung-jae 
Primary antagonist of the series. A third-generation chaebol who lost his father very suddenly. His goal is to find the 3 wooden carvings and will stop at nothing to achieve this. He hides his vast ambition and though he managed to marry the woman he loves, he knows that she loves Woon-gwang and is determined to see his downfall.

Supporting

People around Cha Do-ha
 Kim Byung-se as Cha Myeong-seok
Do-ha's father. He has spent time in prison and his past is covered in a veil.
 Kim Bo-mi as Park Song-i
Do-ha's friend and flatmate.

People around Mo Seung-jae
 Kim Hyun-jin as Secretary Jang
 Jeon Kook-hwan as Ji Chang-wook

People around Song Mi-eun
 Lee Min-ho as Mo Jae-young, her and Seung-jae's son

NIS
 Jang Hyun-sung as Jang Tae-ho
A national intelligence agent and deputy director. Boss of Dong-hyun and Seol-woo.
 Kang Shin-il as Im Suk-hoon, NIS Director.
 Jung Man-sik as Lee Dong-hyun. Currently a public prosecutor but still conducts covert activities for NIS. Main contact of Seol-woo.
 Kim Jong-goo as Robert Yoon

Chewing Entertainment
 Lee Si-eon as Ji Se-hoon
CEO of Chewing Entertainment in which Woon-gwang belongs to.
 Oh Hee-joon as Yang Sang-sik, Woon-gwang's general manager.
 Han Ji-seon as Choi Seol-a, stylist
 Lee Ah-jin as Son Jung-hye, makeup artist

Baek Corporation
 Chun Ho-jin as Lawmaker Baek
A powerful politician in cahoots with Seung-jae and his family.
 Tae In-ho as Seo Ki-chul, a black ops agent and alpha team leader who goes head to head with Seol-woo.
 Moon Jae-won as Team leader Yong Jae-min
 Jo Seung-yeon as Choi Jae-hyuk

Others
 Oh Na-ra as Sharon Kim
Mi-eun's friend and owner of a luxury brand shop in which Woon-gwang is the face of.
 Shin Joo-a as Pi Eun-soo
 Kim Min-young as Woon-gwang's fan	
 Jason Scott Nelson as Kim Seol-woo (voice)
 Lee Jun-hyeok as Director Lee Hyuk-joon
 ?? as Director Yoo Kyung-soo

Special appearances

 David Lee McInnis as Petrov, Russian officer that Seol-woo breaks out of prison 
 Jeon Gook-hwan as Chairman Mo Byung-do, Seung-jae's grandfather (pictorial)
 Lee Do-yeop as PD Choi
 Choi Il-goo
 Jin Seon-kyu
 Im Ji-kyu
 Bbaek Ga
 Song Joong-ki as bankteller
 Namkoong Min
 Jung Dong-gyu as Attorney-General
 Son Jong-hak as Park Joon-won, Songsan Group's Finance Director
 Rátóti Zoltán as Maffia Boss
 Cha Bo-sung as Shop employee

Original soundtrack

Part 1

Part 2

Part 3

Part 4

Part 5

Part 6

Part 7

Part 8

Part 9

Production
 Man to Man was the first South Korea television series to be simulcast on television and Netflix.
 This project is helmed by PD Lee Chang-min, whose past works include Birth of a Beauty and Remember: War of the Son, which was Park Sung-woong's last drama. Two of the actors from the latter drama appeared: Lee Si-eon & Namkoong Min (as a cameo).
 The writer, Kim Won-seok, was the second writer on KBS's hit drama Descendants of the Sun. The first episode had a parody of one of the drama's famous scenes; and two of the actors also made cameo appearances: David Lee McInnis and Song Joong-ki.
 The action scenes for the drama are choreographed by The Man from Nowhere's chief stunt director, Park Jung-ryul.
 First script reading took place on October 3, 2016. Filming began on October 17, 2016 and ended on March 6, 2017, taking place in Seoul, South Korea and Budapest, Hungary.

Ratings
In this table,  represent the lowest ratings and  represent the highest ratings.

Notes

References

External links
  
 
 

JTBC television dramas
South Korean action television series
2017 South Korean television series debuts
South Korean pre-produced television series
2017 South Korean television series endings
Television series by Drama House
Korean-language Netflix exclusive international distribution programming